The 2002–03 Superliga season was the 15th edition since the competition's establishment and the second one since its unification. It was contested by twelve teams, and it ran from 6 October 2002 to 27 April 2003. Debuting team Athletic Bilbao won its first championship, while defending champion Levante UD was the runner-up tied at points with the lionesses, and CF Puebla and CE Sabadell were 3rd and 4th respectively. CFF Estudiantes, AD Torrejón, RCD Espanyol and CF Oviedo Moderno also qualified for the 2003 Copa de la Reina. Like in the previous season, there were no relegations.

Teams and locations

League table

Results

See also
 2003 Copa de la Reina

References

Season on soccerway 

2002-03
Spa
1
women